Silent Cry is a 2008 album by Feeder, or the title song.

Silent Cry or Silent Cries may also refer to:

Books
The Silent Cry, a 1967 Japanese novel by Kenzaburō Ōe
The Silent Cry, novel by Cathy Glass (author)
The Silent Cry, novel by Anne Perry
Silent Cry, 2004 play by Madani Younis from Asian Theatre School/Red Ladder Theatre Company

Film and TV
The Silent Cry, a 1977 film directed by Stephen Dwoskin
Silent Cry (film), a 2003 UK thriller film
Silent Cries, a television film about female POWs in Singapore in 1941
The Silent Cry, an episode of Mannix
A Silent Cry, an episode of Walker, Texas Ranger
Silent Cries, a dance video by choreographer Jiří Kylián

Music
Silent Cry (album), Feeder, 2008
"Silent Cry" (song), a song by Feeder, 2008
"Silent Cry" (Stray Kids song), a song by Stray Kids from Noeasy, 2021
"Silent Cry", a song by Dominick Farinacci
"Silent Cries", a song by Fates Warning from No Exit, 1988